Pál Beőthy de Bessenyő et Örvend (Beöthy; 20 June 1866 – 15 September 1921) was a Hungarian jurist, soldier and politician, who served as Speaker of the House of Representatives between 1913 and 1917.

External links
 Jónás, Károly - Villám, Judit: A Magyar Országgyűlés elnökei 1848-2002. Argumentum, Budapest, 2002. pp. 173–175

1866 births
1921 deaths
Speakers of the House of Representatives of Hungary